Henry Bleecker Metcalfe (January 20, 1805 – February 7, 1881) was an American lawyer and politician who served one term as a U.S. Representative from New York from 1875 to 1877.

Biography 
Born in Albany, New York, Metcalfe moved to New York City in 1811 and to Richmond County in 1816. He studied law. He was admitted to the bar and commenced practice in New York City in 1826. He served as prosecuting attorney of Richmond County from 1826 to 1832.

Judicial career 
Metcalfe was elected county judge in 1840 and served until 1841 when he resigned. He resumed his position of county judge in 1847 and remained until 1875.

Congress 
Metcalfe was elected as a Democrat to the Forty-fourth Congress (March 4, 1875 – March 3, 1877). He served as chairman of the Committee on Expenditures on Public Buildings (Forty-fourth Congress).

Death 
He died in Richmond, Staten Island, New York on February 7, 1881. He was interred in the Moravian Cemetery, New Dorp, Staten Island, New York.

Sources

1805 births
1881 deaths
New York (state) state court judges
Democratic Party members of the United States House of Representatives from New York (state)
19th-century American politicians
Richmond County District Attorneys
19th-century American judges
Burials at Moravian Cemetery
People from Richmondtown, Staten Island